Steven Collins is an Adjunct Associate Professor of Computer Graphics in the Department of Computer Science in Trinity College, Dublin. He is co-manager of the GV2 Research Group. Born in Dundalk, County Louth, his interests in computing began with the Commodore 64 where he single-handedly developed and released the games Badlands and Herobotix.

He is also a co-founder of Havok, a company which provides physics simulation software for computer games and films. The company was sold to Intel in September 2007 for €76M.

In 2005, he was recognized by PC Gamer magazine as being one of the top 50 game industry influencers of that year.

In 2007, Collins started the MSc in Interactive Entertainment Technology course in Trinity College Dublin, where he acts as course director and lectures in real-time rendering. He is quoted as saying that the course was started in order to educate the "future captains of industry" in reference to the games industry. Both Collins and Hugh Reynolds were awarded the Trinity College Dublin Innovation Award for 2007, for their work in co-founding Havok. In March 2008, Collins and Reynolds co-founded "Kore Virtual Machines", a company dedicated to designing computer gaming virtual machines, using the Lua programming language. In October 2007, Kore was purchased by Havok and integrated into their software suite as Havok Script. Collins is currently Chief Technology Officer of King Digital Entertainment, a leading mobile game publisher.

References

External links
Havok.com
Kore.net
Interview with Collins from Team Xbox

Year of birth missing (living people)
Living people
Irish computer scientists
Irish computer programmers
Academics of Trinity College Dublin
Alumni of Trinity College Dublin
People from Dundalk